Leskowsky Hangszergyűjtemény (Leskowsky Musical Museum) is a museum in Kecskemét, Hungary.

It is the largest exhibition of musical instruments in Hungary. The exhibition consists of different instruments, both domestic and foreign. 

The museum was founded in 1979 by Albert Leskowsky.

References 

Museums in Kecskemét